Kemeni may refer to:

Kemeni, Benin
Kemeni, Mali